"Myth" is a song by American dream pop band Beach House, from the band's fourth studio album, Bloom. The song was released as a single on March 26, 2012. The song surfaced on the band's website on March 7, 2012, before its commercial release.

Critical reception
"Myth" received very positive reviews from contemporary music critics. The song was chosen upon release as Pitchfork Media's "Best New Track". Larry Fitzmaurice stated that, "On a surface level, there's no mistaking Myth for a Beach House song. All the sonic elements that have travelled with the Baltimore dream-pop duo during their steady ascent over the last five years are intact: Alex Scally's narcotic guitar, a steady backbeat, and Victoria Legrand's smoky ache of a voice. What sets "Myth" as another sonic evolution for Beach House, then, is all in the details." Fitzmaurice continues by saying, "The layers of echo surrounding Legrand's voice during its chorus, as well as the gauzy glow wrapped around everything, give the impression that the airy expansiveness of 2010's Teen Dream has contracted, but somehow the sound is just as "big", if not bigger, than before. "What comes after this momentary bliss?" Legrand croons at one point. Hopefully, we'll find out soon enough."

Charts

References

External links
 

2012 singles
2012 songs
Sub Pop singles
Beach House songs
Songs written by Victoria Legrand